The 1999–2000 Appalachian State Mountaineers men's basketball team represented Appalachian State University in the 1999–2000 NCAA Division I men's basketball season. The Mountaineers, led by fourth-year head coach Buzz Peterson, played their home games for the final season at the Varsity Gymnasium in Boone, North Carolina as members of the Southern Conference. The team finished the season with a record of 23–9 and 13–3 in SoCon play. They won the SoCon tournament to receive an automatic bid to the NCAA tournament. As No. 14 seed in the South region, they lost to No. 3 seed Ohio State in the opening round.

Roster 

Source

Schedule and results

|-
!colspan=12 style=| Non-conference Regular season

|-
!colspan=12 style=| Conference Regular season

|-
!colspan=12 style=| SoCon tournament
|-

|-
!colspan=12 style=| NCAA tournament
|-

|-

Source

References

Appalachian State Mountaineers men's basketball seasons
Appalachian State Mountaineers
Appalachian State Mountaineers men's basketball
Appalachian State Mountaineers men's basketball
Appalachian State